Llechid was a 6th-century pre-congregational saint of Wales.

Born about 556 AD in Brittany, she was the child of Ithel Hael de 
Cornouaille and an unknown mother. Her family moved to Wales, where many of her siblings founded churches.

She is the Patron Saint of Llanllechid Wales, where she built a Church and where a holy well (now lost) is attributed to her. Llechid's feast day is given as either December 1 or 2nd.

References

6th-century births
6th-century Christian saints
Year of birth unknown
Year of death unknown
Christian female saints of the Middle Ages
6th-century women